Jongile Kilani (born 21 August 1993) is a South African cricketer. He was included in the Border squad for the 2015 Africa T20 Cup. He made his first-class debut for South Western Districts in the 2016–17 Sunfoil 3-Day Cup on 3 November 2016.

References

External links
 

1993 births
Living people
South African cricketers
Border cricketers
South Western Districts cricketers
People from Krugersdorp
Sportspeople from Gauteng